Find Me is Happy Rhodes most recent studio album, released October 19, 2007. Rhodes collaborated with artists who made contributions to the album, these include guitarist Bon Lozaga and bassist Hansford Rowe of Gongzilla, bassist Carl Adami, guitarists Teddy Kumpel and Jon Catler and pianist Rob Schwimmer.

Overview
Rhodes’ 11th studio album to be released, the songs were originally recorded in 2001 but due to the costs of mastering, the album was not released on public sale until October 2007. There are currently no singles released from the album and Rhodes had made no claims to be releasing one.

To assist with the costs of recording and producing the CD herself, Rhodes released a “sampler” disc to fans in 2005 which consisted of 8 tracks from the album. These discs were sold at Rhodes’ live performances in January 2005 at the Tin Angel in Philadelphia, PA. The left over discs were sold on the Ecto mailing list, selling out quickly. The sampler album is no longer available.

A 12th song was recorded – named “Shutdown” – but Rhodes did not include it on the final release of the album.

Track listing
All songs are written by Happy Rhodes.

”One and Many” – 4:36
”Little Brother” – 4:35
”Find Me” – 5:13
”She Won’t Go” – 3:56
”Here and Hereafter” – 4:18
”Charlie” – 4:01
”Can’t Let Go” – 5:28
”Queen” – 4:34
”Treehouse” – 6:25
”Chosen One” – 3:45
”Fall” – 4:51

Personnel

Happy Rhodes – All vocals, Acoustic Guitar, Programming, original artwork
Bob Muller - Drums, Hand Drums, Percussion, Yang Chin
Hansford Rowe - Electric Bass on tracks 1, 4, 5, 6, 7, 8, 10
Teddy Kumpel - All electric Guitars, plus Tamburica Solo and Acoustic Guitar on track 5
Rob Schwimmer – Piano
Carl Adami - Bass on track 9, ostinato on track 11
Jon Catler - Fretless Electric Guitar solo on track 7
Trey Gunn - Warr Guitar on track 8
Bon Lozaga - Electric guitar on track 5
Fab - Additional programming, string arrangements on tracks 2, 10
Michael Seifert - Orchestral arrangement on track 7, Additional programming on track 10

External links
Rhodes’ announcement of the albums completion

References

2007 albums
Happy Rhodes albums